Amrinder Ranjit Singh (born 27 May 1993) is an Indian professional footballer who plays as a goalkeeper for Indian Super League club Odisha and the India national team.

Early life and youth career
Amrinder was born on 27 May 1993 in Mahilpur, Punjab, India. Amrinder took up the game of football at a young age but did not play consistently until the age of 15 when he joined his schools' government ran academy, Sports Wing Academy in Paldi, Hoshiarpur in Punjab. Initially Amrinder started at the under-17 level as a striker at Sports Wing Academy but his coach, Yarvinder Singh, noticed that Amrinder had a good build and reach, and encouraged him to be a goalkeeper. He started excelling as a goalkeeper and stayed at the Sports Wing Academy for another two years. While still at Sports Wing, however Amrinder was selected by the Punjab Football Association to represent the Punjab state national team at the under-17 and under-19 levels. His greatest achievement while with the Punjab team was when he helped Punjab win the BC Roy Trophy. After winning the BC Roy Trophy, he was advised by former Pune player Asim Hassan's father, a well-known coach in Punjab, to trial at the Pune Academy. He passed the trial and was placed in the under-19 squad.

Club career

Pune 
After joining the Pune Academy and showing off his goalkeeping skills during the summer of 2011, Singh was selected to join the first team squad of Pune at the age of 18. He made his debut for Pune when he came on as a substitute during the 2011 Indian Federation Cup after Indian international Subrata Pal came off against East Bengal. Pune lost the match 1–2 but with Singh only conceding one of those goals. Singh then made his I-League debut for Pune coming on as a substitute for Shahinlal Meloly in the 21st minute against East Bengal. Pune lost the match 1–3 with all three goals coming in after Amrinder came on to the pitch. After one more game for Pune, in which Amrinder conceded three goals, Pune FC brought in East Bengal goalkeeper Abhra Mondal on loan for the rest of the season. On 5 February 2012, Amrinder kept his first full clean-sheet of his career against then league leaders Dempo as Pune went on to win the match 1–0.

2012-2013 season 
Amrinder played his first match of the 2012-13 I-League season on 14 April 2013 against ONGC F.C. which ended 1–0 with Pune winning the game and it resulted in Amrinder collecting first clean sheet of the season. Amrinder started in the next match against Air India FC on 20 April, in which Amrinder kept a clean sheet as the team rose to win the game on a big margin of 0–6. Singh played his last match of the season on 11 May in a 2–0 victory against Indian Arrows.

2013–2014 season
Amrinder began the 2013–14 I-League season as Pune's No.1 goalkeeper. He started in their first league match of the season against Mohammedan on 21 September 2013 at the Salt Lake Stadium. During the match, Singh gave away a goal to Josimar as Pune went on to win 3–1. After that match, Singh and Pune went on a run of clean-sheets, keeping five of them in a row before conceding two goals and losing 2–0 to Sporting Goa on 2 November. It was also in this match that Singh received a red card in the 81st minute after he brought down the last man on the ball for Sporting Goa.

On 29 January 2014, Singh made his international club debut for Pune in their AFC Champions League qualifier tie against Hanoi T&T. He played the full ninety minutes in goal for Pune but could not stop Pune from giving away three goals in a 3–0 defeat.

2014–2015 season
Amrinder played his first match of the 2014-15 I-League season against Salgaocar on 17 January 2015. The match ended in a 1–1 draw. Amrinder won his first match of the season with Pune on 24 January against the defending champions Bengaluru which ended with a score 1–3. Amrinder lost his first match of the season against Mohun Bagan on 7 February with a score of 1–0. Amrinder played his last match of the season and last match for Pune on 30 May 2015 against Sporting Goa, which ended in a disastrous loss of 4–0 for Pune.

ATK (loan)
Amrinder was loaned to Indian Super League club ATK for the 2015 season on loan from Pune. He played his first match for ATK on 3 October 2015 in a 2–3 victory against Chennaiyin FC. Amrinder kept his first clean sheet on 23 October against NorthEast United which ended 1–0 to ATK. He lost his first game for ATK in goal on 29 October against Delhi Dynamos (present Odisha) which ended 0–1 to Delhi. ATK went on through playoffs of 2015 ISL and lost to Chennaiyin FC on an aggregate score of 4–2 from both legs with Amrinder in goal.

Bengaluru

2015-16 (loan)
Amrinder signed for Bengaluru on loan from Pune for the 2015-16 I-League season. He kept his first clean sheet of the season in his first match for Bengaluru on 30 January 2016 against East Bengal, which ended 0–1 to Bengaluru. Amrinder lost his first match in goal for Bengaluru against Sporting Goa on 6 February with of score of 1–2 for Sporting. He was also in the goal for Bengaluru in the match against Mohun Bagan on 23 April which ended as disastrous match for Amrinder as he conceded 5 goals for the Mohun Bagan attack, which resulted in a heavy lose for Bengaluru with a score of 5–0. Despite the lose, Bengaluru went on to win the I-League that season and Amrinder went on to win the best goalkeeper of the 2015-16 I-League season award with nine clean sheets under his belt, while also impressing at the AFC Cup, where they became runners up, leading to his loan move being made permanent for the 2016–17 season.

2016-17 
Amrinder signed for Bengaluru on a permanent deal from Pune for the 2016-17 I-League season. He played his first match of the season against Shillong Lajong in a 3–0 victory on 7 January 2017, keeping his first clean sheet of the season on first match. Amrinder lost his first match of the season in goal against East Bengal on 22 January which ended 1–2 to East Bengal. Amrinder was in goal for Bengaluru in their huge victory of 7–0 over DSK Shivajians on 22 April. Amrinder played a pivotal role in the club's campaign in the 2016-17 Indian Federation Cup as they emerged Champions of the season.

Mumbai City

2016 (loan) 
Amrinder was loaned to Indian Super League side Mumbai City from Bengaluru for a short spell. He played his first match for the club in a 2–0 victory over Chennaiyin on 23 November 2016. Amrinder was in goal for Mumbai, when they defeated Kerala Blasters on 19 November in a margin of 5–0. He lost his first match of the season with Mumbai City on 10 December, when they were defeated 3–2 by his former team ATK. Three days later, on 13 December, he played his last match of the season for Mumbai City in the return match against ATK, which ended in a 0–0 draw. Amrinder had an outstanding campaign as he was awarded with the best goalkeeper of the season award.

2017-2021 
Amrinder signed for Mumbai City on a permanent deal from Bengaluru in 2017. He played his first match of the 2017-18 Indian Super League season on 19 November 2017 in a 2–0 loss against his former team and one of the two new entries, Bengaluru. Mumbai won their first match of the season with Amrinder in goal on 25 November against FC Goa, which ended 2–1 to Mumbai. Amrinder kept his first clean sheet of the season on 10 December against Chennaiyin, which ended 1–0 to Mumbai. On 11 March 2018, Amrinder signed a three-year contract extension with Mumbai City FC, which will keep him at club until May 2021. Amrinder played his first match of the 2018-19 Indian Super League season against Jamshedpur on 2 October 2018, which ended in a 0–2 loss for Mumbai. He kept his first clean sheet on 19 October against local rivals FC Pune City in a 2–0 victory. In the next match day on 24 October, Mumbai suffered a disastrous 5–0 loss against FC Goa with Amrinder on goal. Despite the huge loss, Mumbai went on to be victorious against Kerala Blasters on 16 December, as they defeated them on a remarkable 6–1 victory. Mumbai went on to playoffs of 2018-19 ISL with Amrinder but was defeated by FC Goa on an aggregate score of 5–2. Amrinder played his first match of the 2019-20 Indian Super League season on 24 October 2019 in a 0–1 victory over Kerala Blasters, thus collecting his first clean sheet of the season. Mumbai lost their first match of the season with Amrinder on 31 October against Odisha FC which turned out to be a huge loss with a score of 2–4. On 12 February 2020, in the match against FC Goa, Amrinder let in five goals, which resulted in a 5–2 loss for Mumbai. He played his last match of the season against Chennaiyin FC on 21 February, which ended 0–1 to Chennaiyin. Amrinder played his first match of the 2020-21 Indian Super League season against NorthEast United on 21 November 2020, which ended in a 1–0 loss for Mumbai. Amrinder kept his first clean sheet of the season in a 0–1 victory over FC Goa on 25 November. He played a pivotal role the club's success that season, as they won the Indian Super League Winners' Shield and Indian Super League trophy. Amrinder left the club after playing 84 matches for the club, making himself the most capped player in the history of Mumbai City FC. Amrinder kept 10 clean sheets and made 61 saves in 2020–21 season.

ATK Mohun Bagan
On 31 May 2021, ATK Mohun Bagan FC announced the signing of Amrinder Singh on a five-year deal. With the club, he appeared in 2021 AFC Cup group stage matches in Maldives. in this tournament, ATK Mohun Bagan became the group winner of the South Asia Zone (Group D) but lost in the Inter-zone play-off semi-finals against Uzbekistan club FC Nasaf, Amrinter played all 4 matches and kept a clean sheet against Bengaluru FC. In 2021–22 Indian Super League season, ATK Mohun Bagan finished 3rd in the group stage but lost against Hyderabad FC in the Semi-finals. In the campaign, the custodian kept 6 clean sheets in 22 matches. He was also part of 2022 AFC Cup squad, they again became the group winner of the South Asia Zone (Group D) and lost in the Inter-zone play-off semi-finals this time against Malaysian club Kuala Lumpur City. He played 2 matches in this tournament. On 8 September 2022, he left ATK Mohun Bagan by mutual consent.

Odisha FC
Amrinder Singh joined Odisha FC for 2022–23 Indian Super League.

International career
Amrinder represented India U23 during the 2014 Asian Games and was the starting keeper in both of India's games. He was named the captain for India U23s for the 2016 AFC U-23 championship qualifiers in Bangladesh and started in India U23s 2–0 loss to Uzbekistan U23 on 27 March 2015. He got his senior team call-up for the 2019 AFC Asian Cup qualifiers, but did not play any matches.  On 19 August 2017, Singh made his international debut for the senior team against Mauritius, which ended in a 2–1 win for India. He was then called up for the 2018 Intercontinental Cup. He made his first and only appearance in the tournament against New Zealand on 7 June 2018, which ended in a 1–2 defeat for India. Amrinder was included in squad to take part in the 2019 King's Cup. He only played one match in the tournament, and that was against Thailand on 9 June 2019, which India won 0–1. After India qualified for the 2019 AFC Asian Cup, India announced their 23-man squad for the tournament, where Amrinder was called up as the backup goalkeeper. After the Asian Cup, he was called up for the Indian squad to compete in the 2022 FIFA World Cup qualifiers.

Career statistics

Club

International

Honours 

India
 Intercontinental Cup: 2017, 2018
 King's Cup third place: 2019

Bengaluru FC
 I-League: 2015-16
 Federation Cup: 2016-17

Mumbai City FC
 Indian Super League: 2020–21
Indian Super League winners shield: 2020–21

Individual
 I-League Golden Glove: 2015-16
 Indian Super League Golden Glove: 2016

References

External links 

 
 Amrinder Singh at Indian Super League
 Amrinder Singh at Mumbai City FC
 Amrinder Singh at Goal
 

1993 births
Living people
People from Hoshiarpur district
Indian footballers
Association football goalkeepers
Footballers from Punjab, India
India international footballers
India youth international footballers
Footballers at the 2014 Asian Games
2019 AFC Asian Cup players
Asian Games competitors for India
I-League players
Indian Super League players
Pune FC players
ATK (football club) players
Bengaluru FC players
Mumbai City FC players
ATK Mohun Bagan FC players